Neuro Hunter is a cyberpunk-themed first-person shooter/role-playing video game developed by Media Art and published by Deep Silver. It was released on August 19, 2005. The game was marketed as a mix between Deus Ex, System Shock and Gothic series of video games.

Storyline 
The player assumes the role of Hunter, a computer expert who is hired by the Johnston Biotek corporation, referred to as the "Corporation" in the game. Hunter is to repair the network of a mining complex but fails and ends up in a cave world after an explosion. A man called Toadstool finds him and tells him where he is: In an underground world where a computer freak called Hacker has seized power. Left alone by the Corporation, Hunter has to find a way back to the surface all by himself. On his quest he meets Kathryn, a mysterious woman, who sometimes helps the player. Hunter faces many dangers and problems; for instance, when he is confronted by sinister figures in an underground prison colony. Of course we cannot give away whether he finds the suspected lift to the surface there.
Cyberpunk role playing game with atmospheric graphics First Person View 36 main and 6 side quests wrapped into an intriguing Sci-Fi-story Gigantic subterranean World: extensive caves, secret labs, mystic temples, generator rooms uvm. 69 NPCs, you can interact and trade with 14 different monster classes and many subclasses: reptiles, hybrids, humanoid mutants, giant spiders, quantum ghosts and more... 14 different weapons with second attack options: from the rusty knife to the plasma cannon. 30 instructions and recipes, for building useful items, food or exotic weaponry skillsystem with 7 character abilities for individual problem solutions and a high replay quality 6 classes of different implants to improve your characters’ abilities Tactical realtime-fights in the Matrix – hacking of networks and sabotage of security systems Theft and Data-Theft included! impressive render cutscenes from 3D-iO All ingame text was recorded in a professional sound studio

External links 
Official Neuro Hunter website
Media Art. Company

2005 video games
First-person shooters
Science fiction video games
Video games developed in Russia
Windows games
Windows-only games
Deep Silver games
Cyberpunk video games